Zareabad may refer to:
 Zareabad, Ardabil
 Zareabad, Hamadan